This article is about the list of Atlético Petróleos de Luanda basketball players. Atlético Petróleos de Luanda is an Angolan basketball club from Luanda, Angola and plays their home games at Pavilhão da Cidadela in Luanda.  The club was established in 1980.

2011–2018
Atlético Petróleos de Luanda basketball players 2011–2017

1991–2000
Atlético Petróleos de Luanda basketball players 1991–2000 = Angola league winner

References

Atlético Petróleos de Luanda basketball players